Negatiw, sometimes anglicized Negativ, (August 5, 1945 – 1973) was a gray Russian-born Arabian stallion. He was sired by Naseem, a Skowronek son bred in England, out of the Polish-bred mare, Taraszcza. Negatiw was credited as the stallion that returned the Ibrahim sire line to Poland. He is also regarded as the most internationally influential grandson of Skowronek.

Life and career 
Negatiw, was foaled at Russia's Tersk Stud in 1945. He was sired by the of Crabbet-bred stallion Naseem, out of the Polish-bred mare, Taraszcza. Andrez Krzysztalowicz of Poland’s Janow Podlaski Stud described Negatiw as "Extremely dry and refined, with a small, chiseled head accented by beautifully large, dark and luminous eyes and small ears. His legs were relatively correct (though slightly sickle-hocked) and his back and topline were strong and a bit long. As a stallion, he was strikingly refined and distinguished – he represented a rare example of perfection."

He was the winner of two races in Russia and at the age of 9, in 1954, he was also named the "Champion Stallion" at the All-Union Agricultural Exhibition in Moscow. Negatiw was put to stud, and stayed at Tersk for 11 years, siring 105 foals. However, his offspring did not do so well on the racetrack, therefore in 1962, at the age of 17, he was sold to Poland. There, his name was changed from Negativ, to Negatiw.

In Poland, Negatiw was bred to many more mares, where his offspring were much more successful. He was afterwards used as a stud in two different places in Poland: Janow Podlaski Stud (1962–1968) and Michalow Stud (1969–1973). For the rest of his lifetime, he was bred to other mares, up until his death in 1973. Negatiw was 28 years old.

Offspring and legacy 
At Tersk, some of Negatiw's best-siring sons were Suvenir  and *Salon, who was also the latter sire of both *Moment, the head sire of Tersk, and U.S. and Canadian Champion Stallion *Muscat. Bandos was one of the most legendary horses foaled by Negatiw. He was out of the mare Polish-bred mare, Bandola, known as the "Queen of Poland." Bandos went on to sire 3 Derby winners and 10 Polish National Champions. Negatiw's highly acclaimed son, Naborr, came to the All-Union Agricultural Fair in Moscow with him in 1954, and was awarded a "certificate of the first class", equivalent to a Reserve Champion. He went on to become a leading sire of champion horses in the United States and Canada.

Pedigree 
Negatiw's sire, Naseem, was a Skowronek son who had been sold to Russia in 1936 by Lady Wentworth of the Crabbet Arabian Stud for a price estimated at  £50,000. At the beginning of World War II, his dam, Taraszcza, was taken to Tersk by the Russian army, alongside a number of other Polish mares. Enwer Bay and Gazella ll were some of his other ancestors included in the group taken by the Russians.

Notes

References 

1945 racehorse births
1973 racehorse deaths
Individual male horses
Individual Arabian and part-Arabian horses
Poland–Soviet Union relations